Chisholm Spring was a small trading post in Oklahoma Territory, two miles east of present-day Asher, Oklahoma.  The post was established by frontier cattleman Jesse Chisholm (for whom the famous Chisholm Trail was named ) in 1847.  The settlement attracted many plains Indians, but efforts to create a town were aborted when Chisholm moved to Kansas in 1862.

References

Buildings and structures in Pottawatomie County, Oklahoma
1847 establishments in Indian Territory